Deafheaven / Bosse-de-Nage is a split EP between the American, San Francisco Bay Area black metal bands Deafheaven and Bosse-de-Nage. The album was released in an LP format through The Flenser on November 20, 2012. Deafheaven contributed a cover of the post-rock band Mogwai's "Punk Rock" and "Cody" from their 1999 album Come On Die Young, while Bosse-de-Nage contributed the original composition, "A Mimesis of Purpose".

Critical reception

Mark Wilson of Exclaim stated that with the Mogwai cover, "Deafheaven continued to push boundaries and blur the lines between black metal, post-rock, shoegaze and drone." He also further wrote: "The song's slow build is relentless without ever getting stale or sacrificing the emotional release so crucial to this style of music, not to mention the dynamics are flawless, with blasting drums, huge, dense walls of sound and screeching, guttural screams that make your blood boil." Wilson also described the Bosse-de-Nage track as "a near-perfect use of dynamics and instrumentation," noting that "the band isn't afraid to branch out and make use of a variety of instruments," despite staying closer to their black metal core than Deafheaven. Brandon Stosuy of Pitchfork described the Mogwai cover as "a great fit for Deafheaven, who have a way with extended post-rock hauntings."

Track listing
Side A: Deafheaven
 "Punk Rock / Cody" (Mogwai cover) – 10:36

Side B: Bosse-de-Nage
 "A Mimesis of Purpose" – 9:02

Personnel
Additional musicians
 Astrid J. Smith – violin and string arrangements on "A Mimesis of Purpose"

Production
 Deafheaven – production on "Punk Rock / Cody"
 Jack Shirley – production, recording, mixing, mastering on "Punk Rock / Cody"
 Justin Weis – recording, mixing on "A Mimesis of Purpose"

References

External links
 Deafheaven / Bosse-de-Nage on The Flenser's official website

Deafheaven albums
2012 EPs
Split EPs
Albums produced by Jack Shirley
Bosse-de-Nage albums